Arthur (2007(?) – 8 December 2020) was an Ecuadorian street dog who attached himself to a Swedish extreme sports team when they were competing in the Adventure Racing World Championship in 2014, was brought to Sweden and has inspired a foundation to help other Ecuadorian street dogs.

In November 2014, Mikael Lindnord was in Ecuador as leader of the four-person Team Peak Performance, competing in the Adventure Racing World Championship in the Amazon rainforest, when he offered a canned meatball to a street dog. The dog then followed the team for the rest of the race. He sometimes had to be hauled out of deep mud, and during an ocean kayaking leg he jumped into the water and swam alongside until Lindnord hauled him aboard, after which he delayed the team by jumping back in after fish. Lindnord named him Arthur after King Arthur of Britain.

After the team raised money through a Twitter campaign, received assistance from the Ecuadorian Minister for Social Affairs, and obtained permission from the Swedish Board of Agriculture, Lindnord was able to bring Arthur back to Sweden. Arthur required veterinary care for wounds that he had apparently had for several months and had to remain in quarantine for 120 days; in March 2015, after dental surgery, a "small operation" and a press conference, he went to live with Lindnord and his family in Örnsköldsvik. According to Lindnord, Arthur was seven years old when brought to Sweden.

In May 2015 Arthur accompanied the team in the Wings For Life World Run in Kalmar.

The team started a charity named Arthur's Foundation to help street dogs in Ecuador. There are plans for a "Community Dog" project to provide food and veterinary care, and Lindnord has co-written a book about Arthur, which was published in 2016.

In late November 2014 an Ecuadorian man told an Ecuadorian newspaper that Arthur was his dog, Barbuncho, and by late December others had also claimed to be the dog's owner, but after a petition was started by Ecuadorians asking for his former owners to be punished for causing his wounds, all the claims were dropped.

Arthur was to have been the subject of a film, with shooting scheduled to begin in early 2021, but was diagnosed with a malignant tumour and died approximately six weeks later, on 8 December 2020.

References

External links
 
 

Individual dogs
2020 animal deaths